Italy has sent delegations to the Summer Paralympics since the first edition in Rome 1960, the International Paralympic Committee (IPC).

Medal Tables

*Red border color indicates tournament was held on home soil.

Multiple medallists

These are official report of International Paralympic Committee.
 Updated to Tokyo 2021.

See also 
 Italy at the Summer Olympics
 Italy at the Winter Paralympics

Notes

References

External links
Italian Paralympic Committee
International Paralympic Committee
Media Guide Tokyo 2020 
Gli Azzurri alle Paralimpiadi dal 1960 al 2018